Vukota Pavić (born February 3, 1993) is a Montenegrin professional basketball player, who lastly played for Mornar Bar of the Montenegrin League.

Professional career
On November 16, 2016, Pavić signed for the rest of the season with the Montenegrin club Mornar Bar.

References

External links
 Profile at aba-liga.com
 Profile at balkanleague.net
 Profile at bgbasket.com

1993 births
Living people
ABA League players
BC Balkan Botevgrad players
KK Lovćen players
KK Mornar Bar players
KK Sutjeska players
Montenegrin expatriate basketball people in Bulgaria
Montenegrin men's basketball players
Power forwards (basketball)
Sportspeople from Nikšić